The Indian cricket team toured Bangladesh for two Test matches from 17 January to 28 January 2010. India won the series 2–0.

Squads

Test series

1st Test

2nd Test

Media coverage

Television
 NEO Cricket (live) - India, Hong Kong, Japan, Taiwan, Korea, Sri Lanka and Bangladesh
 Zee Sports (live) - United States of America
 Commonwealth Broadcasting Network (live)  - Canada
 Fox Sports (live) - Australia
 Sky Sports (live) - United Kingdom
 Supersport (live) – South Africa, Kenya and Zimbabwe
 Eurosport (live) - Europe
 StarHub (pay per view) - Malaysia and Singapore

References

International cricket competitions in 2009–10
2010 in Indian cricket
2010 in Bangladeshi cricket
2009-10
Bangladeshi cricket seasons from 2000–01